If I Was a River is the ninth studio album from American singer-songwriter Willie Nile. The all-piano album was released in November 2014 under River House Records. 
Nile recorded If I Was a River on the same Steinway grand piano that he played the night John Lennon was killed, December 8, 1980.  Nile was in Studio "A" at The Record Plant in New York City making Golden Down and John and Yoko were working on Walking on Thin Ice in Studio C that night.

Critical reception 
If I Was a River has been positively received and has had favorable reviews.
Uncut critic Luke Torn wrote: "Intimate, understated gem from New York City's unofficial poet laureate".
Pop Matters writer Steve Horowitz writes "Nile knows we have a river of love within that connects us to others.....He doesn’t intellectualize it. Instead, Nile gently draws this from us through his music."
Peter Gerstenzang, in The Village Voice, wrote "Nile has a strong command of the keys, embellishing his songs with lovely cord voicings, but never overwhelming you with a flurry of flourishes. One listen and you may find yourself using your sleeve to wipe away the tears."
Freshindependence says If I Was a River will take your breath away and move you to a place that will check your ego at the door and take you back to what matters most in this crazy old world."
Jeffrey Sisk of Pittsburgh in Tune said; "The spellbinding 10-track release features sparse arrangements with Nile accompanying himself on piano, rather than his usual guitar. The results are truly special. I can’t recommend this one highly enough, folks."
Writing in No Depression Harrisonaphotos says "this album ends with two delightful love songs, delivered with gravitas and care way beyond my expectations. "The One You Used to Love" is truly wonderful and his piano playing is very nearly classical. The finale, "Let Me Be the River" brought a tear to my eye the first time I heard it."
Carlo Wolff, in the Cleveland Jewish News, describes "If I Was a River" as the type of music that becomes timeless, is often oracular, regularly poetic, mysterious and personal, and refers to Nile along with Bob Dylan and Leonard Cohen as bards and masters of melody and meaning.
James Mann affirms in the December 2014 "Ink19" that If I Was a River "glistens with a quiet power and grace. Masterful"
In The Alternate Root Danny writes: "The album does out Willie Nile though, showing the man behind the curtain has tenderness in his pen as he scribes ten tales of introspection and self-assessment."
Han van Bree of Soundz Magazine declares "If I Was A River is a timeless album that sounds familiar right from the opening track".
Associated Press: "A top-notch album”

Track listing

Personnel
Musicians
 Willie Nile – piano, vocals
 Steuart Smith – acoustic and electric guitars, baritone guitar, Elbow, bass, pump organ, Hammond organ, Rhodes, backing vocals
 David Mansfield – mandolin, acoustic guitar, violin, viola
 Frankie Lee – backing vocals
Production and additional personnel
 Executive Producers: Kevin Collins, Gary Lippman, Jeffrey Schneider
 Record producer by Stewart Lerman and Willie Nile
 Engineered by Sean Kelly
 Additional Engineering – David Mansfield
 Mixing by Stewart Lerman 
 Recorded at Hobo Sound, Weehawken, NJ
 Mastering by Greg Calbi at Sterling Sound, NYC
 Art direction by Deborah Maniaci
 Photography Cristina Arrigoni
 Publicity – Cary Baker – conqueroo.com
 Booking – Adam Bayer at Fleming Artists

References

2014 albums
Willie Nile albums
Albums produced by Stewart Lerman